Cesare Giulio Viola (26 November 1886 – 3 October 1958) was an Italian screenwriter. He was nominated for the Academy Award for Best Original Screenplay for his work in Shoeshine (1946).

Selected filmography
 Luciano Serra, Pilot (1938)
 Naples Will Never Die (1939)
 First Love (1941)

References

External links

20th-century Italian screenwriters
Italian male screenwriters
1958 deaths
1886 births
20th-century Italian male writers